The Prevention of Crime (Ireland) Act 1848 was a bill passed by the British Parliament regarding crime in Ireland, which was then part of the United Kingdom of Great Britain and Ireland. The bill was introduced by Sir George Grey on 29 November 1847, and was passed by both houses; it received royal assent in December 1847 (11 & 12 Vic c. 2). It was passed because of growing Irish nationalist agitation that was causing the British government concern about a possible violent rebellion against British rule in Ireland.

The bill gave the Lord Lieutenant of Ireland the power to organise the island into districts and bring police forces into them at the districts' expense. It limited who could own guns, and under penalty, coerced all of the men to join in a type of Posse comitatus in each district between the ages of 16 and 60 to assist in apprehending suspected murderers when killings took place, or else be guilty of a misdemeanour themselves.

References 

Acts of the Parliament of the United Kingdom concerning Ireland